De Bosjes is a hamlet in the Dutch province of Gelderland. It is a part of the municipality of Buren, and lies about 11 km northwest of Tiel.

De Bosjes is not a statistical entity, and the postal authorities have placed it under Beusichem. The hamlet consists of about 10 houses.

References

Populated places in Gelderland
Buren